Frank Beard may refer to:
 Frank Beard (golfer) (born 1939), American professional golfer
 Frank Beard (musician) (born 1949), American drummer for ZZ Top
 Frank Beard (bishop), American bishop in the United Methodist Church